The Lady of the Camellias is a novel by Alexandre Dumas.

The Lady of the Camellias may also refer to:
The Lady of the Camellias (1915 Negroni film), a 1915 Italian historical drama film
The Lady of the Camellias (1915 Serena film), a 1915 Italian historical drama film
The Lady of the Camellias (1947 film), a 1947 Italian film directed by Carmine Gallone
The Lady of the Camellias (1953 film), a 1953 French-Italian film directed by Raymond Bernard
The Lady of the Camellias (1981 film), a 1981 French-Italian drama film